Pei Irukka Bayamen is a 2021 Tamil language horror comedy film directed by S. Kaarthieswaran and starring S. Kaarthieswaran and Gayatri Rema in the lead roles. Produced by Thilaka Arts, it was released on 1 January 2021.

Cast 
S. Kaarthieswaran
Gayatri Rema
Kothai Santhanam
M. R. Arjun
Niyathi
Abiram
Muthukaalai
Nellai Siva

Production 
The film was shot in and around the Kerala and Tamil Nadu border. A huge house near Maraiyur was used to shoot.

Plot 
A newly wed couple moves to a bungalow, arguing. They hate each other and they refuse to talk to each other. At midnight, 2 ghosts arrive and terrorizes the couple. They quickly call in multiple saamis  to ensure their safety. When none of them work, that resort to Youtube  and find out that they should not fear ghosts. They then make the ghosts their friends and then the ghosts agree that they should help the couple to resolve their problems. The problem between the couple resolved, they happily move out of the house.

Release 
The film was released theatrically across Tamil Nadu on 1 January 2021. A critic from Times of India called the film "an easily forgettable snooze fest", adding it had a "lack of an interesting screenplay, thrills and comedy". A review from Maalai Malar also suggested that the film lacked thrills. A critic from NewsTodayNet noted "had the script written better, the end product could gave been more engrossing".

References

External links 
 

2021 films
2020s Tamil-language films
Indian drama films
2021 comedy horror films
Indian horror film remakes
Indian comedy horror films